German submarine U-422 was a Type VIIC U-boat of Nazi Germany's Kriegsmarine during World War II.

She carried out one patrol. She was a member of one wolfpack. She did not sink or damage any ships.

She was sunk by an American aircraft north of the Azores on 4 October 1943.

Design
German Type VIIC submarines were preceded by the shorter Type VIIB submarines. U-422 had a displacement of  when at the surface and  while submerged. She had two shafts and two  propellers.

U-422 was fitted with five  torpedo tubes (four fitted at the bow and one at the stern), fourteen torpedoes, one  SK C/35 naval gun, 220 rounds, and two twin  C/30 anti-aircraft guns. The boat had a complement of between forty-four and sixty.

Service history
The submarine was laid down on 11 February 1942 at the Danziger Werft (yard) at Danzig (now Gdansk), as yard number 123, launched on 10 October and commissioned on 10 February 1943 under the command of Oberleutnant zur See Wolfgang Poeschel.

She served with the 8th U-boat Flotilla from 10 February 1943 and the 1st flotilla from 1 August 1943.

Patrol and loss
The boat's only patrol was preceded by a trip from Kiel in Germany to Bergen in Norway. U-422 then left Bergen on 8 September 1943 and headed for the Atlantic Ocean via the gap between Iceland and the Faroe Islands. U-422 was depth charged and strafed by what was reported as a Handley Page Halifax on the 23rd. Three men were wounded, two of them seriously.

On 4 October, she was attacked and sunk by a FIDO homing torpedo dropped by an American TBM Avenger which was accompanied by a F4F Wildcat. Both aircraft had come from the escort carrier .

Forty-nine men went down with the U-boat; there were no survivors.

Wolfpacks
U-422 took part in one wolfpack, namely:
 Leuthen (15 – 24 September 1943)

References

Bibliography

External links

German Type VIIC submarines
U-boats commissioned in 1943
U-boats sunk in 1943
U-boats sunk by US aircraft
1943 ships
Ships built in Danzig
Ships lost with all hands
World War II shipwrecks in the Atlantic Ocean
World War II submarines of Germany
Maritime incidents in October 1943